The international Stockholm Junior Water Prize is a competition that encourages young people's interest in water and environment issues. Beginning in 1995, the award is given annually for an outstanding water project by a young person or a small group of young people at a ceremony held during the World Water Week in Stockholm. The first two years the competition was held on a national level in Sweden. From 1997 onward the competition has been held in its  current international format. The international Stockholm Junior Prize winner receives a USD 15,000 scholarship and a blue crystal sculpture.

The finalists at the international Stockholm Junior Water Prize are the winners of their national contests, drawing over 10 000 entries from over 30 countries. The national and international competitions are open to pre-university young people ages 15–20 who have conducted water-related projects on topics on environmental, scientific, social, or technological importance. The national competitions have helped students around the world become active in water issues.

Crown Princess Victoria of Sweden is the Patron of the Stockholm Junior Water Prize. Stockholm International Water Institute administers the Stockholm Junior Water Prize.

Past winners
In 2019, Macinley Butson, Australia, won the Stockholm Junior Water Prize for having developed a new, novel and innovative ultraviolet sticker to accurately measure large UV exposures for solar disinfection of water.

In 2018, Caleb Liow Jia Le and Johnny Xiao Hong Yu, Singapore, won the Stockholm Junior Water Prize for having produced reduced graphene oxide from agricultural waste products, a material that can be used to purify water.

In 2017, Rachel Chang and Ryan Thorpe, United States won the Stockholm Junior Water Prize for having created a novel approach to rapidly and sensitively detect and purify water contaminated with E. coli, Shigella, Cholera, and Salmonella.

In 2016, Sureeporn Triphetprapa, Thidarat Phianchat, and Kanjana Komkla, Singapore, won the Stockholm Junior Water Prize for their water retention device that mimics the water retention of the Bromeliad plant.

In 2015, Perry Alagappan, United States, won the Stockholm Junior Water Prize for having invented a method that uses nanotechnology to remove electronic waste from water, the product of his research experiments with support from the members of the Barron Lab of Rice University, Houston, Texas.

In 2014, Hayley Todesco, Canada, won the Stockholm Junior Water Prize for having invented a method that uses sand filters to treat oil contaminated water and recover water for reuse.

In 2013, Naomi Estay and Omayra Toro, Chile won the Stockholm Junior Water Prize for their work on how living organisms can help clean oil spills in extremely low temperatures.

In 2012, Luigi Marshall Cham, Jun Yong Nicholas Lim and Tian Ting Carrie-Anne Ng, Singapore, won the Stockholm Junior Water Prize for their research on how clay can be used in a low cost method to remove and recover pollutants from wastewater.

In 2011, Alison Bick, United States, won the Stockholm Junior Water Prize for having developed a low-cost portable method to test water quality using a mobile phone.

In 2010, Alexandre Allard and Danny Luong, Canada, won the Stockholm Junior Water Prize for their research on readily available bacteria able to degrade polystyrene and decontaminate polystyrene-contaminated water.

In 2009, Ceren Burçak Dag, Turkey, won the Stockholm Junior Water Prize for having developed a high tech solution that used PVDF, a smart material with piezoelectric properties, to transfer the kinetic energy of raindrops into electrical energy.

In 2008, Joyce Chai, United States, won the Stockholm Junior Water Prize for having developed a novel technique to quantifying the potential toxicity of silver nanoparticles to the world's water sources and the environment, and in doing so repudiating the assertion that consumer products that contain nanosilver are more reliable and less environmentally hazardous than alternatives.

In 2007, Adriana Alcántara Ruiz, Dalia Graciela Díaz Gómez and Carlos Hernández Mejía, Mexico, won the Stockholm Junior Water Prize for their project on the elimination of Pb(II) from water via bio-adsorption using eggshell.

In 2006, Wang Hao, Xiao Yi and Weng Jie, China, won the Stockholm Junior Water Prize for their originality, ingenuity and tenacity in their use of low-cost, ecologically friendly technology to restore a polluted urban river channel.

In 2005, Pontso Moletsane, Motebele Moshodi and Sechaba Ramabenyane, South Africa, won the Stockholm Junior Water Prize for their revolutionary solution to minimize the need for water in small-scale irrigation. They developed a low-current electric soil humidity sensor which uses light detection to control water pipe valves and improve irrigation efficiency.

In 2004, Tsutomu Kawahira, Daisuke Sunakawa and Kaori Yamaguti, Japan, won the Stockholm Junior Water Prize for the development and application of an environmentally friendly organic fertiliser for the Miyako Island. The method is applicable to many places around the world.

In 2003, Claire Reid, South Africa, won the Stockholm Junior Water Prize for an innovative, practical, easily applicable technique for planting and successfully germinating seeds in water-scarce areas to improve rural and peri-urban livelihoods.

In 2002, Katherine Holt, United States, won the Stockholm Junior Water Prize for research that looked at how foreign species could be introduced to benefit the Chesapeake while preserving the Bay's native oyster species and meeting national environmental goals.

In 2001, Magnus Isacson, Johan Nilvebrant and Rasmus Öman, Sweden, won the Stockholm Junior Water Prize for their innovative and relevant research on the use of natural materials to remove metals in leachate from landfills.

In 2000, Ashley Mulroy, United States, won the Stockholm Junior Water Prize for a contemporary project that investigated how inefficient waste water treatment processes can lead not only to antibiotic contamination in American waterways, but also to progressive resistance among harmful bacteria to those same antibiotics that once controlled them.

In 1999, Rosa Lozano, Elisabeth Pozo and Rocío Ruiz, Spain, won the Stockholm Junior Water Prize for an innovative project that used sea urchins, starfish and sea cucumbers to measure the effectiveness of an EU beach protection program on Spain’s western Mediterranean coast.

In 1998, Robert Franke, Germany, won the Stockholm Junior Water Prize for his design of the Aquakat, a solar-powered, flow-through reactor for the treatment of industrial wastewaters.

In 1997, Stephen Tinnin, United States, won the first international Stockholm Junior Water Prize for having investigated the correlation between the reproductive rate of sea urchins and water pollution.

In 1996, Maria Bergström, Katarina Evans, Anette Gustafsson and Elin Sieurin, Sweden, won the Stockholm Junior Water Prize for their project proposing the establishment of a wetland area to reduce the outflow of nutrients into the Baltic Sea, and thereby also creating a recreational park for the enjoyment of the citizens in Nyköping municipality.

In 1995, Mattias Wiggberg, Sweden, won the very first Stockholm Junior Water Prize for his research of overfertilization and its effect on Lake Kvarnsjön in Södertälje municipality, as well as his proposed actions to mitigate the problems he found. The local government acted on his research.

References

External links 
 Stockholm Junior Water Prize Official page of the SJWP.
 International SJWP info Information about SJWP from the Water Environment Federation.

Swedish awards
Environmental awards
Water and the environment